JAINA is an acronym for the Federation of Jain Associations in North America, an umbrella organizations to preserve, practice, and promote Jainism in USA and Canada. It was founded in 1981 and formalized in 1983. Among Jain organization it is unique in that it represents Jains of all sects, and thus effectively represents the entire Jain community in USA and Canada.

History
The Jain Center of Southern California was founded in 1979. Lalit Shah, its Vice President in 1980, suggested establishment of an umbrella organization of all the Jain organizations in North America. At that time about 15 Jain organizations were in existence, including the Jain Center of America, Jain Meditation International Center founded by Chitrabhanu, International Mahavir Jain Mission founded by Sushil Kumar, and Jain centers in Boston and Chicago. The plan for JAINA was conceptualized at the first Jain Convention held in Los Angeles in 1981, and formalized at the second Jain Convention in New York in 1983, with the advice and approval of Chitrabhanu and Sushil Kumar.

The conventions are now termed JAINA Conventions, and have been held biennially in Los Angeles, New York, Detroit, Chicago, Toronto, San Francisco, Pittsburgh, Chicago, Toronto, Philadelphia, Chicago, Cincinnati, Houston, Detroit, Atlanta, New Jersey & Los Angeles. JAINA also publishes textbooks on Jainism, a calendar, and a monthly magazine, and operates an online Jain library.

Overview
There are over 70 organizations that are part of JAINA. JAINA represents over 160,000 Jains in USA and Canada. It also has 32 subcommittees involved in different activities, including Young Jains of America(YJA), for ages 14-29.

JAINA Symbol

The Federation of Jain Associations in North America uses a modified version of the standard Jain symbol, the Jain Prateek Chihna. It replaces the swastika with an Jain Aum because of the negative connotations associated with the swastika in the western world.

Conventions
JAINA conventions draw thousands of representatives from Jain communities in the USA and Canada.

JAINA Committees
There are over 30 JAINA committees. Based on the needs, these committees are more or less active and are at times retired.
YJA (Young Jains of America)
Award Committee Standing
Election Committee Standing
Fund Raising Committee Standing
JAINA Constitution & By-Laws as of January 15, 2009 18
Interfaith Activities Committee Standing
Jiv Daya Committee Standing
Long Term Planning Committee Standing - Dipak Doshi(Chairman), Yogendra Jain (Immediate Past Chair)
Publications Committee Standing
Tirthoddhar Committee Standing
Veerchand Raghavji Gandhi Scholarship
Fund Committee Standing
World Community Service Committee Standing
Book Store Committee Operational
Calendar Committee Operational
Education Committee Operational
Governmental & International
Relations Committee Operational
Jain Digest Membership Committee Operational
Jain Networking Forum (JNF) Operational
Marriage Information Services Committee Operational
Membership Committee Operational
Library Committee Operational
Legal Advisory Committee Operational
Media/Public Relations Committee Operational
Media Production Committee Operational
Patron Program Committee Operational
Pilgrimage Committee Operational
Public Affairs Council Operational
Scholar Visitation Committee Operational
Technology Committee Operational
Web Site Committee Operational
Academic Liaison Committee Ad Hoc
Adhyatmic Committee Ad Hoc
Assistance Program Committee Ad Hoc
Constitution Review Committee Ad Hoc
Exhibition Committee Ad Hoc
Jain Centers Resources Committee Ad Hoc
Jain Milan Committee Ad Hoc
Jain Rituals Committee Ad Hoc
North American Jain Families
Assistance Program Committee Ad Hoc
North American Jains History Committee Ad Hoc
Senior Housing Committee Ad Hoc

Interfaith and Relief Actions
JAINA has been involved in several interfaith actions. It also organizes relief activities.

JAINA Ratna Award
The JAINA Ratna Award is the highest recognition awarded by the North American Jain community for major long term contributions. The first one was given in 1989 to Prof. Duli Chandra Jain for his pioneering editing and publication "Jain Study Circle" It is awarded irregularly after 2-6 years. So far nine JAINA Ratna Awards have been given. The JAINA Ratna award is distinct from the 26 Jain Ratna awards given by the Prime Minister of India Atal Bihari Vajpayee on the occasion of Lord Mahavira's 2600th birth anniversary celebrations.

Young Jains of America (YJA)
Young Jains of America (YJA) is the youth arm of the Federation of the Jain Associations in North America (JAINA), a non-profit religious organization. YJA serves Jain youth from ages 14-29. YJA was first established in 1991, and held its first biennial youth convention in 1994, and having biennial conventions there on after.

See also
 Jain Center of America
 Jainism in the United States
 Jainism in Canada
Jain Center of Southern California

References

1981 establishments in California
Jain organisations
Religious organizations established in 1981
Religious organizations based in the United States